Pont-la-Ville may refer to: 

 Pont-la-Ville, Haute-Marne, commune in the Haute-Marne department in north-eastern France
 Pont-la-Ville, Switzerland, municipality in the district of Gruyère in the canton of Fribourg in Switzerland